Prasocuris phellandrii is a species of beetle in family Chrysomelidae. It is found in the Palearctic

References

Chrysomelinae
Beetles described in 1758
Taxa named by Carl Linnaeus